Rajiv Maragh (born July 9, 1985, in Spanish Town, Jamaica) is a jockey in American Thoroughbred horse racing. An Indo-Jamaican, he is the son of a jockey who rode in Jamaica before relocating to Florida where he began a career as a horse trainer.

Rajiv Maragh rode his first winner at Tampa Bay Downs on February 1, 2003. He got his big break in 2008 when he was 14th in the national earnings list. Rapidly developing into a top jockey since moving north to compete at NYRA tracks, in 2009 he has been a winner of several Grade 1 races.

He was seriously injured in a spill at Belmont Park in July 2015 and has been cleared in November 2016 to start riding again.

He rode Mucho Macho Man to a 3rd-place finish at the 2011 Kentucky Derby. He rode his first Breeder's Cup winner on Caleb's Posse in the dirt mile.

In 2017 he relocated to California and the same year was honored with Comeback Jockey Of The Year Award.

Year-end charts

References

External links

Rajiv Maragh at the NTRA

1985 births
Living people
American jockeys
Jamaican emigrants to the United States
Jamaican jockeys
Jamaican people of Indian descent
People from Spanish Town